Below is a list of intervals expressible in terms of a prime limit (see Terminology), completed by a choice of intervals in various equal subdivisions of the octave or of other intervals.

For commonly encountered harmonic or melodic intervals between pairs of notes in contemporary Western music theory, without consideration of the way in which they are tuned, see .

Terminology
The prime limit henceforth referred to simply as the limit, is the largest prime number occurring in the factorizations of the numerator and denominator of the frequency ratio describing a rational interval. For instance, the limit of the just perfect fourth (4:3) is 3, but the just minor tone (10:9) has a limit of 5, because 10 can be factored into  (and 9 into ). There exists another type of limit, the odd limit, a concept used by Harry Partch (bigger of odd numbers obtained after dividing numerator and denominator by highest possible powers of 2), but it is not used here. The term "limit" was devised by Partch.
By definition, every interval in a given limit can also be part of a limit of higher order. For instance, a 3-limit unit can also be part of a 5-limit tuning and so on. By sorting the limit columns in the table below, all intervals of a given limit can be brought together (sort backwards by clicking the button twice).
Pythagorean tuning means 3-limit intonation—a ratio of numbers with prime factors no higher than three.
Just intonation means 5-limit intonation—a ratio of numbers with prime factors no higher than five.
Septimal, undecimal, tridecimal, and septendecimal mean, respectively, 7, 11, 13, and 17-limit intonation.
Meantone refers to meantone temperament, where the whole tone is the mean of the major third. In general, a meantone is constructed in the same way as Pythagorean tuning, as a stack of fifths: the tone is reached after two fifths, the major third after four, so that as all fifths are the same, the tone is the mean of the third. In a meantone temperament, each fifth is narrowed ("tempered") by the same small amount. The extremes of the meantone systems encountered in historical practice are the Pythagorean tuning, where the whole tone corresponds to 9:8, i.e. , the mean of the major third , and the fifth (3:2) is not tempered; and the -comma meantone, where the fifth is tempered to the extent that three ascending fifths produce a pure minor third.(See meantone temperaments). The music program Logic Pro uses also -comma meantone temperament.
Equal-tempered refers to X-tone equal temperament with intervals corresponding to X divisions per octave.
Tempered intervals however cannot be expressed in terms of prime limits and, unless exceptions, are not found in the table below.
The table can also be sorted by frequency ratio, by cents, or alphabetically.
Superparticular ratios are intervals that can be expressed as the ratio of two consecutive integers.

List

See also
List of chord progressions
List of meantone intervals
List of musical scales and modes

Notes

References

External links
"Names of seven-limit commas", XenHarmony.org. (Archived copy)
"List of Overtones", Xenharmonic Wiki.
"All Known Musical Intervals" (by Dale Pond), Svpvril.com.

Pitch intervals